Herbert Day (1 April 1868 – 14 October 1947) was an Australian cricketer. He played one first-class match for South Australia in 1898/99.

See also
 List of South Australian representative cricketers

References

External links
 

1868 births
1947 deaths
Australian cricketers
South Australia cricketers
Cricketers from Adelaide